George Francis "Squanto" Wilson (March 29, 1889 – March 26, 1967) was an American professional baseball player. He played six games in Major League Baseball, primarily as a catcher. He batted .188 in five games for the Detroit Tigers in 1911, and appeared in one game for the Boston Red Sox in 1914 as a pinch runner. In 1923, he served as manager of the Hanover Rebels in the Blue Ridge League.

The reason for Wilson's nickname is unknown, but he was raised in New England, and "Squanto" was a Native American who helped the English colonists in Massachusetts develop agricultural techniques and served as an interpreter between the colonists and the Wampanoag.

Wilson graduated from Bowdoin College of Brunswick, Maine, in 1912, and went on to become one of only seven Bowdoin alumni who played in the major leagues during the 20th century. After his baseball career, Wilson was a high school principal in Winthrop, Maine, and later started a variety store chain. He died in Maine in March 1967; he was survived by his wife and a daughter.

References

Further reading

External links

1889 births
1967 deaths
Major League Baseball catchers
Detroit Tigers players
Boston Red Sox players
Lynn Leonardites players
Lynn Shoemakers players
Lynn Fighters players
Memphis Chickasaws players
Minor league baseball managers
Bowdoin Polar Bears baseball players
Baseball players from Maine
People from Old Town, Maine
People from Winthrop, Maine